Marlin is a British sports car manufacturer founded in 1979 in Plymouth as Marlin Engineering and now located in Crediton, Devon, England.

The company was founded by Paul Moorhouse, who, after building a series of one-off cars for his own use decided to put one into production as a kit car. The first kits were sold in 1979.

The first product was the Roadster which remained in the line up until sold, along with the Berlinetta, to Yorkshire Kit Cars (YKC) in 1992 who kept them in production until the owner retired in 2006 and sold them on to Aquila Sports Cars Ltd.

In the mid 1990s the company was sold to Terry and Mark Matthews who introduced the Hunter model.

In 2016, Marlin bought Avatar Sports Cars to primarily build roadsters. As of May 2019 Marlin Sports Cars have ceased trading and the company is for sale. No further production is planned.

In April 2021 Kevin Richardson bought the company.

Marlin Roadster

The Roadster was the original car and was based around Triumph Herald range components (e.g., Spitfire, Herald, Vitesse, GT6). The two seat body built of aluminium and glass fibre had a radiator grille slightly similar to pre-war Alfa Romeo sports cars. As standard, any of Triumph's 4- or 6-cylinder engines of the time could be fitted (1147-2498cc), along with overdrive or non-overdrive gearboxes. In 1981 the Morris Marina became the donor car replacing the Triumph and the Marina engine became standard although many customers fitted engines, gearboxes and back axles of their own choice.

Berlinetta

The Berlinetta was launched in 1983 version using Ford Cortina Mk III or IV parts.
Of those who had bought Roadsters originally, some now wanted more room for offspring and partners who also wanted to enjoy the fun of the Marlin. So 1983 saw the introduction of the Ford Cortina (later, Sierra) based Berlinettas as a 2+2 coupé.  This came complete with previously unheard of luxuries such as wind-up windows, a lockable boot and a hardtop option. A touring car rather than a sports car, sales of the car were fewer than the Roadster, mainly due to the more limited market for such a car.

Cabrio

The 1991 Cabrio was an updated Roadster based on Ford Sierra parts.

Hunter

Based on the Cabrio the Hunter was a complete, factory built car.

Sportster

The Sportster is the latest in the Roadster line but completely updated with the BMW E36 six cylinder engine as standard. It is available as a kit or fully built.

5EXi

As a complete change from the retro looks of the previous models, the 5EXi is a modern two seat, mid engined sports car using Honda Civic, Rover K-series engines or Audi 1.8T engine . The car is built up around a space frame on which are fastened glass fibre body panels.

It is available as a kit or fully built. It is claimed by the factory that the kit can be assembled in 100 hours

External links
 Company website
 Marlin Owners Club

References

Car manufacturers of the United Kingdom
Sports car manufacturers
Kit car manufacturers
Companies based in Devon